Neal Jones (born January 2, 1960) is an American stage, film, and television actor. He is best known for his role as Billy Kostecki in Dirty Dancing.

Early life and education
Neal Jones was born on January 2, 1960, in Wichita, Kansas.  Jones attended the Webster University Conservatory of Theatre Arts in St. Louis, Missouri.

Career
After attending the Webster University Conservatory of Theatre Arts in St. Louis, Jones moved to New York and began his professional career in Nicol Williamson's production of Macbeth at the Circle in the Square. This was followed by The Corn Is Green at the Lunt-Fontanne Theatre and the Tony Award-winning, Big River, at the Eugene O'Neill Theatre.  He went on to appear in numerous New York stage productions, including Mike Leigh's Ecstasy and Tom Dulack's Diminished Capacity at The New Group, Kenneth Branagh's Public Enemy at the Irish Arts Center, and The Great Lakes Theater Festival’s world premiere of Dylan Thomas's A Child's Christmas in Wales in Cleveland, Ohio, directed by Clifford Williams.  As a director he staged the world premiere of Celtic Tiger (Me Arse) by Don Creedon, and the New York premiere of Joseph O'Connor's Red Roses and Petrol, both at the Irish Arts Center in New York, where he has also served as Artistic Director.  He is a member of the Actors Studio.

His first film appearance was in Dirty Dancing, followed by more than 25 films, including Taylor Hackford's The Devil's Advocate (one of four films in which he appears with Al Pacino), In America and G.I. Jane. He was nominated for Best Supporting Actor at the 2008 Malibu International Film Festival for his role in the independent film Mona.

Jones also has appeared in several television series, including The Sopranos, Sex and the City, Law & Order, and Criminal Minds (as Karl Arnold aka The Fox). He appeared in seven episodes of the FX series Rescue Me as Peter Reilly, the gay son of Chief Jerry Reilly. Jones's work in Generation Kill was singled out for praise by reviewers Matthew Gilbert of The Boston Globe and Alan Sepinwall of the Star-Ledger.

Personal life

Filmography

Film

Television

References

External links

1960 births
Living people
Male actors from Kansas
Male actors from New York City
American male film actors
American male stage actors
American male television actors
Male actors from St. Louis
Actors from Wichita, Kansas
Webster University alumni